Hassan Blasim (born 1973) is an Iraqi-born film director and writer. He writes in Arabic. He is a citizen of Finland.

Blasim left Iraq in 2000 to escape persecution for his films, including The Wounded Camera, filmed in the Kurdish area in northern Iraq and about the forced migration of Kurds by Saddam Hussein's regime. After travelling in Europe for four years, he settled in Finland in 2004, where he was granted asylum. He made four short films for the Finnish broadcasting company Yle. His short story collection The Madman of Freedom Square was long-listed for the Independent Foreign Fiction Prize in 2010. His book The Iraqi Christ, translated from Arabic to English by Jonathan Wright, was published by Comma Press in 2013. A selection of his stories was published as The Corpse Exhibition by Penguin US in 2014. It won a number of awards including one of four winners in the English Pen's Writers in Translation Programme Awards. In 2014, he became the first ever Arabic writer to win the Independent Foreign Fiction Prize for The Iraqi Christ.

Filmography
The Wounded Camera
Uneton, 2006
Luottamuksen arvoinen, 2007
Elämä nopea kuin nauru, 2007
Juuret, 2008

Books
Short Films (2005) collection of articles in: Cinema Booklets: Series of Publications for the Emirates Film Competition. Ed. S. Sarmini. Abu Dhabi: Emirates Cultural Foundation.
Poetic Cinema (2006) collection of articles. Ed. Salah Sarmini, in: Cinema Booklets: Series of Publications for the Emirates Film Competition. Abu Dhabi: Emirates Cultural Foundation
Diving into Existing (2007) correspondence and dairies in collaboration with Adnan al-Mubarak. 
Wounded Camera (2007) Writings on cinema.
The Shia’s Poisoned Child (2008) story collection.
Madman of Freedom Square (2009) Comma Press, translated from the Arabic by Jonathan Wright
The Iraqi Christ (2013) Comma Press, short stories, translated from the Arabic by Jonathan Wright
The Corpse Exhibition (2014) Penguin US, short stories, translated from the Arabic by Jonathan Wright
Iraq +100 (2017) Tor Books, short story anthology (editor)
God 99 (2019) novel, Comma Press, translated from the Arabic by Jonathan Wright

References

External links 
Hassan Blasim's blog
Madman of Freedom Square by Marianne Brace, The Independent

Finnish writers
Finnish film directors
21st-century Iraqi poets
Iraqi film directors
1973 births
Living people
Place of birth missing (living people)
Iraqi emigrants to Finland
Finnish people of Iraqi descent
Refugees in Finland
Finnish Arabic-language poets
21st-century Iraqi writers
Iraqi short story writers
21st-century Iraqi novelists
Naturalized citizens of Finland